Salingyi is a town in Salingyi Township, Monywa District, Sagaing Region in Myanmar. It is the administrative seat for Salingyi Township, and is at a tri-crossroads with roads heading north-west to Yinmabin, north to Monywa, and south-west to Kyadet.  On the east of town, there is a large textile mill which was completed in 2005.

Notes

External links
"Salingyi Map — Satellite Images of Salingyi" Maplandia

Township capitals of Myanmar
Populated places in Sagaing Region